Yu-Gi-Oh! Dungeon Dice Monsters is a dice-driven tactics video game based on an original board game featured in the Yu-Gi-Oh! storyline. It was developed and published by Konami, and released on March 21, 2001, in Japan, February 11, 2003, in North America and July 11, 2003, in Europe for the Game Boy Advance. The gameplay revolves around battling opponents using magical dice placed on a board to create dungeons. It contains both a single-player campaign mode in which the player battles the AI, as well as a head-to-head multiplayer mode.

Critics gave the game mixed reviews, praising the game's strategy elements, while criticizing its lack of a story mode and difficult learning curve, made harder by the lack of a tutorial.

A real world, table top equivalent of the game was also released.

Reception 

The game received an aggregate score of 67/100 on Metacritic, indicating "mixed or average reviews".

Craig Harris of IGN rated the game 8/10 points, calling the gameplay "extremely enjoyable" and not formulaic. He praised the interface but criticized the lack of story or exploration, as well as the absence of a tutorial. Stating the game is "extremely confusing", he said that the player would need a couple of hours to learn the rules.

"Evil Star Dingo" of GamePro rated the game 3/5 points, calling it "kind of brilliant" as a board game, but criticizing the lack of story mode and the fact that the game lacks a quicksave function, forcing you to lose if your battery runs out or you have to stop playing in the middle of a long match. They also called the graphics "very utilitarian" and the sound "8-bit NES quality", commenting that "the music needs to die".

Steve Steinberg of GameSpy rated the game 90/100, calling the gameplay "astoundingly complex", but criticizing the steep learning curve and lack of any storyline.

Notes

References 

2001 video games
Digital collectible card games
Game Boy Advance games
Game Boy Advance-only games
Multiplayer and single-player video games
Video game spin-offs
Video games developed in Japan
Dungeon
Dice games